Gaëtan Saku Bafuanga Baya is a French triple jumper.

2013 World Championships
Baya competed at the 2013 World Championships in Athletics where he advanced to the finals of the triple jump.  Baya was the last qualifier (12th place) from the qualification round, where he tied with Renjith Maheshwary of India with a jump of 16.63m.  Baya advanced on a tiebreaker since his 2nd farthest jump (16.37m) was 9 centimeters better than that of Maheshwary (16.28m).  In the finals Baya's best jump was 16.79m in his second opening jump finishing seventh in the opening part of the finals.  The top 8 after the first three jumps are able to jump three more times, but Baya was unable to beat his mark of 16.79m and ultimately finished in 7th place.

References

External links
 

Living people
French male triple jumpers
Year of birth missing (living people)